Sega, S.A. SONIC (also known as Segasa and Segasa d.b.a. Sonic) was a Spanish coin-operated amusement machines company established by Sega Enterprises-related shareholders incorporated by Bertram Leroy Siegel as MD in March 1968, which lasted until its dissolution in 2006 – under the management of  Eduardo Morales Hermo, as Marketing Director first, Vice President and CEO, who acquired the company from original shareholders Martin Bromley, Richard Stewart & Raymonf Lemaire in 1994. By 1972, the company was a pioneer of the import of the video arcade games to Europe, starting with Pong, followed by Space Invaders, Galaxian and Asteroids. They produced pinball machines between 1972 and 1986. First, they imported American pinball machines during the sixties and seventies and later decided to make their own. Their most successful pinball machines were produced under the brand name SONIC. In 1973 the company moved to new, larger facilities located in Parla, becoming registered as Sega.S.A Sonic, although commercially it continues to use the name Segasa.

List of Sega, S.A. SONIC Pinball Machines
 Astro-Flite
 Baby Doll
 Big Ben
 Big Ben
 Cannes
 Casbah
 Casino Royale
 Darling
 Dealer's Choice
 Gulfstream
 High Ace
 Lucky Ace
 Monaco
 Spanish Eyes
 Travel Time
 Triple Action

List of Sega, S.A. SONIC Pinball Machines under the brand name SONIC
 Bird Man
 Butterfly
 Cherry Bell
 Chorus Line
 Faces
 Gamatron
 Hang-On
 Jai-Alai..
 Joker's Wild
 Mars Trek
 Night Fever
 Odin Deluxe
 Pole Position
 Prospector
 Solar Wars
 Space Queen
 Star Wars
 Star-Flite
 Storm
 Super Straight
 Third World

References

See also
 Sega Pinball Inc., a division of Sega which existed from 1994 until 1999
 Zaccaria (company), a former Italian company of pinball and arcade machines
 Taito of Brazil, a former Brazilian company of pinball and arcade machines
 Inder, a former Spanish company of pinball machines

Entertainment companies of Spain
Pinball manufacturers
Sega divisions and subsidiaries